The BBC Global 30 was a worldwide stock market index, run as a global economic barometer. Started by the BBC on 29 September 2004 and last updated on 31 December 2019, it mixed the economic information of 30 of the world's largest companies based in three continents. It proved to be very volatile, as many of the companies had major gains and losses during the index's lifetime.

Constituents
The companies in the index (since 2013) are:

See also
S&P Global 100
Dow Jones Global Titans 50

References

External links 
Information about the launch of the index

Global stock market indices
Global 30